The Colours of My Father: A Portrait of Sam Borenstein is a 1992 Canadian short animated documentary film directed by Joyce Borenstein.

Summary
The film explores her father, the Canadian painter Sam Borenstein, using various animation techniques alongside integrating archival material, filmed sequences and the paintings themselves to reminisce friends and family and bringing his artwork to life.

Accolades
It was nominated for an Academy Award for Best Documentary Short. In Canada, it was named best short documentary at the 12th Genie Awards.

See also
Ryan - 2004 Oscar-winning animated documentary short similar in content

References

External links

Watch The Colours of My Father at NFB.ca

1992 films
1992 documentary films
1992 independent films
1992 short films
Canadian independent films
Canadian short documentary films
Canadian animated short films
1990s short documentary films
Documentary films about painters
Documentary films about Jews and Judaism
National Film Board of Canada documentaries
National Film Board of Canada animated short films
Quebec films
Canadian animated documentary films
Jewish Canadian films
Best Short Documentary Film Genie and Canadian Screen Award winners
1990s English-language films
1990s Canadian films